The sixth season of the food reality television series, Man v. Food, premiered on the Travel Channel December 4, 2017 at 9PM ET. It is the second season to be hosted by actor and food enthusiast Casey Webb, who took over for Adam Richman, the show's original host, in 2017. Webb visits local eateries in different cities to sample their "big food" offerings before taking on an existing food challenge in each city.

Webb's second-season tally for Man v. Food wound up at 8 wins for "Man" and 6 wins for "Food".

Episodes

External links
 Man v. Food official website

References

2017 American television seasons
2018 American television seasons
Man v. Food